Peacock is an unincorporated community in Stonewall County, Texas, United States. According to the Handbook of Texas, the community had an estimated population of 125 in 2000.

Geography
The townsite was originally called Alluvia when it was established along the now defunct Stamford and Northwestern Railroad, which stretched from Stamford to Plainview. The rail line crossed the Salt Fork Brazos River just to the southwest of Peacock near the community of Oriana (now a ghost town).

Education
Public education in the community is provided by the Aspermont Independent School District. Its post office closed in 1993.

References

External links

Unincorporated communities in Stonewall County, Texas
Unincorporated communities in Texas